is a Japanese footballer currently playing as a forward for JEF United Chiba.  He was born in Tokyo. His father is from Uganda and his mother is Japanese.

Career statistics

Club
.

Notes

References

External links

2002 births
Living people
Association football people from Tokyo
Japanese footballers
Ugandan footballers
Association football forwards
J2 League players
JEF United Chiba players